The Lawton Metropolitan Statistical Area, as defined by the United States Census Bureau, is an area consisting of two counties – Comanche and Cotton – in Oklahoma, anchored by the city of Lawton.  As of the 2010 census, the MSA had a population of 130,291.

Counties
Comanche
Cotton

Communities

Cities
Cache
Elgin
Lawton (Principal city)
Walters (County Seat)

Towns
Ahpeatone
Chattanooga (partial)
Cookietown
Devol
Emerson Center
Faxon
Fivemile
Fletcher
Geronimo
Hooper
Hulen
Indiahoma
Medicine Park
Randlett
Sterling
Taylor
Temple

See also
Oklahoma census statistical areas

References

Metropolitan areas of Oklahoma